Na Omi Judy Shintani is a Japanese American artist whose work focuses on storytelling and remembrance of people who were imprisoned, her initial focus being Japanese Americans incarcerated during World War II. Shintani creates interactive displays to shine light on historical issues and create a space of transformation and healing along with teaching history through portraying personal experiences.

Early life 
Na Omi Judy Shintani, also known as Judy Shintani, was born in Ames, Iowa. Her father is from Poulsbo, Washington and her mother is from Honolulu, Hawaii. Shintani's father's family had an oyster farming business that was lost in the 1940s when they were taken to Camp Tulelake during World War II. Eventually, Shintani's family ended up settling in the Central Valley of California. It was here that her mother became the first Asian American elementary school teacher in Lodi, California, and her father worked in television broadcasting. Shintani grew up in a small, central valley region, before she moved away to the Bay Area for college.

Career 
Shintani has exhibited her work throughout California, the Pacific Northwest and Southwest. She founded the Kitsune Community Art Studio in an old dairy barn in Half Moon Bay, California, where she currently resides. In addition to owning and running the art studio, she works as an art instructor at Foothill Community College in Los Altos, California and is teaching artists at Creativity Explored, an art gallery that focuses on showcasing artists with disabilities. Shintani is a member of the Asian American Women's Artist Caucus and a board member of the Northern California Women's Caucus for Art. She is also involved in WEAD, a Women's Environmental Arts Directory.

Education 
She has a Bachelor of Science in Graphic Design, from San José State University along with a Masters of Transformative Art, which she got from John F. Kennedy University, Berkeley. Some topics that were included in her courses at JFK University were learning about Expressive Arts with elderly clients and holistic approaches to arts education. Along with these degrees her education also involves various workshops and other programs some of which include traditional kimono sewing, Dream it Build it (an installation workshop) and Native American Pottery.

Recent work 
Shintani's most recent exhibition is titled Dream Refuge for Children Imprisoned. This exhibition was held in 2019 at the Triton Museum of Art in Santa Clara, California. The installation comprises life-size drawings of children sleeping in a circle, which is a symbol of healing and inclusion, along with a few children sleeping on the floor in the middle of the circle. The drawings represent Japanese American Concentration Camps during World War II (in which her father is represented); Central American children, who are living at the United States border, separated from their families and imprisoned; and Native American boarding school children, who were taken from their families and denied their culture. In addition to the installation, recordings of stories and personal experiences of individuals who lived through these  times are playing in the room. This exhibition was meant to be a healing installation that would shine light on the hard times of incarceration in the United States history.

Medium and subject/intent of artwork

Medium 
Shintani works within the visual arts. Her artwork includes conceptual mediums, installations, and sculpture. Often, her work includes found or recycled objects, video, words, organic materials, textiles, and cultural clothing to create her installations and assemblages. She works with whatever material most successfully expresses the story being told.

Subject and intent of artwork 
During World War II, President Franklin Roosevelt issued Executive Order 9066, which caused 120,000 mostly Japanese- Americans to be evacuated and imprisoned in 10 incarceration camps. This executive order directly impacted Shintani's family, which is why her work tries to acknowledge repressed emotions, memories, and feelings about this time. As an individual whose family faced this trauma, Shintani considers her art a personal process of transforming and healing for herself and her family.  Shintani is working to try and take people beyond the words written in a textbook and look at personal experiences and how to use this material to show how the past connects to what is happening today.

Shintani's artwork focuses on remembrance, storytelling, and connection. The assemblages and installations are used to create performances and facilitate social interactive activities that produce stories that shine light on important issues. The subjects of her work are predominantly made up of people who were imprisoned and their memories, along with the thoughts of their families, therefore, Shintani has focused a large part of her career on researching and producing artwork that will give a voice to these internal memories or hidden stories about history. Shintani's career exploration of Japanese American history has expanded to include other cultures whose children have been incarcerated in America. Working with communities is important to Shintani, as she believes that art can lead someone in search of their identity. This community involvement occurs as viewers of Shintani's artwork are encouraged to participate and become art collaborators through interacting with the artwork and providing feedback on their thoughts.

Solo exhibitions 
2011: Enso Art Gallery, Half Moon Bay, CA

2014: Healing Adornment, Harbor Gallery, Half Moon Bay, CA

2015: Storytelling and Ritual, Santa Fe Internment Camp, Santa Fe Art Institute, Santa Fe, NM

2016: Resilience & Identity, Peninsula Museum of Art, Burlingame, CA

2017: Stories of Displacement Community Art Project, University of Pittsburgh, Pittsburgh, PA

          E09066 Then They Came for Us, Springfield College, Springfield, MA

          Shining Light on Remembrance, Ruth's Table, San Francisco, CA

2019: Dream Refuge for Children Imprisoned, Triton Museum of Art, Santa  Clara, CA

Awards 
2012, Peninsula Arts Council Diamond Award for Donor sponsor- Coastside Doctors without borders art fundraiser.

2013 Half Moon Bay Review Reader's Choice Favorite Local Artist, Honor mention

2014 Asian Pacific Islander Cultural Center Sponsorship Award

2014 ISKME Big Ideas Fest Artists in Residence

2015 Artist in Residence Santa Fe Art Institute

2016 Artist in Residence, Creativity Explored, San Francisco, CA

2017 Fellowship, Vermont Center for Art

2019 Artist in Residency, San Joaquin Delta College, Stockton, CA

References 

Living people
Year of birth missing (living people)
21st-century American women artists
American artists of Japanese descent
Artists from Iowa
John F. Kennedy University alumni
People from Ames, Iowa
San Jose State University alumni
Wikipedia Student Program